Carlotta Antonelli (born 25 July 1995) is an Italian actress. She's best known for her role as Angelica Sale in the Netflix series Suburra: Blood on Rome (2017-2020).

Filmography

Film
Bangla (2019)
Morrison  (2021)

Television
Solo (2016)
Suburra: Blood on Rome (2017-2020)
Immaturi - La serie (2018)
Vivi e lascia vivere (2020)
Bangla la serie (2022)
Bang Bang Baby (2022)

References

External links
 

1995 births
Living people
21st-century Italian actresses